Minichamp may refer to:
Minichamps
a small Victorinox knife model